"Carrie Anne" is a song written by Allan Clarke, Graham Nash, and Tony Hicks and released by British pop rock group the Hollies. The song was recorded on 1 May 1967 and was released as a single in the same month by Parlophone Records in the United Kingdom and Epic Records in the United States.  It became a hit in 1967, reaching #3 on the UK Singles Chart.  It was also a hit in the US and Canada, peaking at #9 on both pop charts. It also reached No. 4 in the Irish charts.

Conception and recording
According to Allan Clarke the song was written during a concert the group did with Tom Jones and the song was written mainly by Graham Nash and Tony Hicks with Allan Clarke supplying the lyrics for the middle eight. The introduction features vocal harmonies strongly influenced by the Beach Boys. The song features a steelpan solo, likely the first use of the instrument on a pop record. The solo (mostly a harmonized restatement of the vocal melody) was probably played by Trinidadian Ralph Richardson, though others argue it may have been Mario Gibbins.
The song was recorded in only two takes on 1 May 1967 at EMI's Abbey Road Studios. The first take was a false start and can be heard on the compilation The Hollies at Abbey Road: 1966 to 1970.

Cash Box called it "a gently driving, pulsating, soft-rock venture that is likely to stir up a lot of activity with the teens."

The song is a shy tribute to Marianne Faithfull, as was Gene Clark's "My Marie".

The song appeared on the soundtrack of Michael Apted's 1974 movie Stardust. It was also used in the HBO series The Sopranos, episode “Down Neck” (Season 1, Episode 7), during one of Tony’s flashbacks.

Charts

Cover versions
The Slovak-language rendering "Je môj sen" was recorded in 1968 by Tatjana Hubinská.
American singer-songwriter Tommy Keene recorded a version that was included on his 2004 rarities compilation, Drowning—A Tommy Keene Miscellany. It was also included on the 1995 Eggbert Records release Sing Hollies in Reverse
 Ali Campbell covered the song on his 2010 album 'Great British Songs'. It was released as a UK single on 8 November 2010
The B-side "Signs That Will Never Change" was recorded first by the Everly Brothers, released in 1966 on the Two Yanks in England album.
Shania Twain performed this song as a cover in her Las Vegas show, Shania: Still the One, running from December 2012 to December 2014.
Game Theory recorded a live version of the song that was included on the 2016 reissue of their album Lolita Nation.
Claude François covered the song in November 1967 under the French title "L'Homme au traineau"

In popular culture 
Actress Carrie-Anne Moss reportedly was named (by her mother) in honour of the song, which was released three months before her birth.

References

External links
Lyrics

1967 singles
The Hollies songs
Parlophone singles
Songs written by Graham Nash
Songs written by Allan Clarke (singer)
Songs written by Tony Hicks
1967 songs
Epic Records singles